Ferrari used their 1.5 L Colombo 125 V12 engine in two models:
 1947 Ferrari 125 S
 1948–1950 Ferrari 125 F1

125